Charun is an administrative unit, known as Union Council, of Chitral District in the Khyber Pakhtunkhwa province of Pakistan.

It is the northernmost district of Pakistan. The district of Chitral is divided into two tehsils and 24 Union Councils.
Chitral
Mastuj

See also

 Chitral District

References

External links
Khyber-Pakhtunkhwa Government website section on Lower Dir
United Nations

Populated places in Chitral District
Union councils of Chitral District